The Copa del Generalísimo 1951 Final was the 49th final of the King's Cup. The final was played at Estadio Chamartín in Madrid, on 27 May 1951, being won by CF Barcelona, who beat Real Sociedad de Fútbol 3–0.

Details

References

1951
Copa
FC Barcelona matches
Real Sociedad matches